Allison Baver (born August 11, 1980) is an American retired short track speed skater. A member of the U.S. short track speed skating squad beginning in 2002, Baver earned multiple medials in ISU World Cup competition. Baver competed in the 500m, 1000m, 1500m, and 3000m relay events and trained with the US permanent winter sports Olympic team in Salt Lake City, Utah. In the 2005–2006 season, she was ranked third overall in world rankings. In 2010 she won a bronze medal at the 2010 Winter Olympics.

Baver was born in Reading, Pennsylvania on August 11, 1980. At 11, Baver competed in the National Roller Skating Championships Philadelphia, PA, and at Wilson High School, she was a soccer player and cheerleader. She did not take up short track speed skating until her junior year of high school.

In 2003, Baver graduated from Penn State with a Bachelor of Arts degree in marketing and management. Baver earned an MBA at the New York Institute of Technology.

Baver is also a public speaker associated with All American Speakers Bureau. On April 20, 2017, Baver was featured as a keynote speaker at Penn State University Women in Business' "Powerful Woman Paving the Way Conference".

Athletic career
Baver competed in the 2002 Winter Olympics in Salt Lake City. At the 2006 Winter Olympics, in Turin, Italy, Baver finished seventh in the Women's 500 m competition, following a third-place finish in Semifinal A and a collision with the Czech Republic's Kateřina Novotná in Final B, which took her out of the race for fifth place.

On February 8, 2009, Baver and teammate Katherine Reutter collided on the third lap of the 1500 m race in Sofia, Bulgaria. Baver fractured her leg in multiple places.

At the 2010 Winter Olympics, in Vancouver, Baver competed in three events.  In the 1500 m, Baver did not make it past the semifinals. In the 1000 m, Baver was disqualified in the heats. In the 3000 m relay, Baver's U.S. team finished fourth but were awarded the bronze medal after one of the teams was disqualified for an infraction. Baver competed in the relay heats and qualified for a medal.

On February 25, 2007, Baver won her first U.S. National Championship. Between 2008 and 2010, Baver was represented by Wilhelmina Sports.

Later career
On December 1, 2020, Variety reported that Baver's production company announced an upcoming slate of movies, television shows and documentaries. In addition to executive producing and acting, Baver serves as a series creator.

Filmography

Television
Baver appeared as a nurse and stand-in actress on Season 3 of Yellowstone, released in 2020, with Kevin Coster.

Films
In 2020 Baver appeared as Summer Sanders, a reporter, in the film, Six Feet Apart. It was filmed and took place during the COVID-19 pandemic.

In 2021 Baver appeared in an uncredited role as Marsha Tanner in the film, No Man of God. It had its world premiere at the Tribeca Film Festival on June 11, 2021, and was released in the United States on August 27, 2021, by RLJE Films. It was also executive produced by Allison Baver Entertainment.

As of December 16, 2021, Baver was indicted for allegedly defrauding the US Government during COVID-19 with fraudulent business claims to receive $10 million. According to the indictment, she claimed that her company, which she formed in 2019, had as many as 430 employees and a monthly payroll of over $4 million.

Influence

Leadership
On April 21, 2010, Speaker Pelosi and Rep. Bart Stupak met with Allison Baver to discuss the B.J. Stupak Scholarship.Baver to discuss the B.J. Stupak Scholarship.

Baver in 2016 was elected to a four-year term as one of seven vice presidents of the U.S. Olympians and Paralympians Association.

On January 19, 2018, Baver was on a panel to urge Congress to help kids win with early learning and care.  She met with members of Congress on Capital Hill and discussed the role that early learning and care programs play in developing children's social-emotional skills, which include “executive-functioning skills” like working as a team and practicing self-control. After fracturing her leg during a competition in 2009, Baver relied on social-emotional skills to recover and ultimately work with her teammates to win the bronze medal in the women's short track speed skating relay just one year later.

Philanthropy
Baver is the founder of the Off the Ice Foundation, established in 2010.  The foundation, based in Salt Lake City, provides skating sports and education programs for schools and communities internationally.

Arrest
On December 15, 2021, Baver was charged with fraudulently applying for $10 million in COVID relief payments and funneling some of the money to Elijah Wood's production company SpectreVision to fund the 2021 film, No Man of God, starring Wood. Prosecutors said Baver submitted eight Paycheck Protection Program loan applications in April 2020 seeking $10 million for her entertainment firm. In each request, Baver said her average monthly payroll was as much as $4.7 million, but she actually had no payroll at all, court documents show.  If convicted, Baver could spend up to 40 years in prison.  Her pending criminal case is filed as United States v. Baver (2:21-cr-00520).

On January 18, 2022, Baver plead "not guilty" to nine federal charges. Following two postponements, her trial is scheduled to begin June 26, 2023.

Awards and honors
In October 2010, Baver was the Grand Marshal for the 2010 Pennsylvania State University Homecoming celebrations.

See also
List of Pennsylvania State University Olympians
World Fit

References

External links
 
 
 
 
 ISU profile

1980 births
Living people
American female speed skaters
American female short track speed skaters
Olympic bronze medalists for the United States in short track speed skating
Short track speed skaters at the 2002 Winter Olympics
Short track speed skaters at the 2006 Winter Olympics
Short track speed skaters at the 2010 Winter Olympics
Medalists at the 2010 Winter Olympics
Sportspeople from Reading, Pennsylvania
Smeal College of Business alumni
New York Institute of Technology alumni
21st-century American women